Océano is the third studio album by Argentine singer Pablo Ruiz. It was released in 1989.

Track listing 

 Océano
 La Chica De La Tele
 Soñando En La Lluvia
 Mi Corazón Se Fue
 Este Mundo
 Quiero Tu Amor
 Hawái
 Ámame Pronto
 Hey Valentina
 Papá
 La Malagueña

References 

Pablo Ruiz (singer) albums
1989 albums